Petrus Roselli was a composer based in Italy at the beginning of the sixteenth century.  The name could indicate a French born composer by the name of Pierre Roussel, and he was possibly the same as the Pietro Rossello found in the Ferrarese ducal chapel (1499-1502).  He is known for his mass Missa Baisez moy, based on the popular song Baisez-moi attributed to Josquin.

References

16th-century Italian composers
Renaissance composers
Date of birth unknown
Date of death unknown